Manduel is a commune in the Gard department in southern France. Nîmes-Pont-du-Gard station, with high speed connections to Paris and Perpignan and regional services to Avignon, Nîmes and Montpellier, is situated in the commune.

Population

Notable people
 

François Fournier (1866–1941), politician

See also
Communes of the Gard department
 Costières de Nîmes AOC

References

External links

 Panorama of Manduel

Communes of Gard